The 1975 South African Open was a combined men's and women's tennis tournament played on outdoor hard courts in Johannesburg, South Africa. The men's events were part of the 1975 Commercial Union Assurance Grand Prix. It was the 72nd edition of the tournament and was held from 17 November through 25 November 1975. Harold Solomon and Annette du Plooy won the singles titles.

Finals

Men's singles
 Harold Solomon defeated  Brian Gottfried 6–2, 6–4, 5–7, 6–1

Women's singles
 Annette du Plooy defeated  Brigitte Cuypers 6–3, 3–6, 6–4

Men's doubles
 Bob Hewitt /  Frew McMillan defeated  Karl Meiler /  Charlie Pasarell 7–5, 6–1

References

South African Open
South African Open (tennis)
Open
Sports competitions in Johannesburg
1970s in Johannesburg
November 1975 sports events in Africa